Erdoğan Cabinet is the name of any of four cabinets of the Republic of Turkey:
Cabinet Erdoğan I (2003–2007)
Cabinet Erdoğan II (2007–2011)
Cabinet Erdoğan III (2011-2014)
Cabinet Erdoğan IV (since 2018)